Qiu Jin, also known as Qiu Jin: A Revolutionary, is a 1983 Chinese biographical film co-written and directed by Xie Jin, starring Li Xiuming as the revolutionary Qiu Jin. The film also features Li Zhiyu, Chen Xiguang, Yu Shizhi, Wang Fuli, Huang Meiying, Cong Shan, Zhang Kezhong, Wu Wenlun, and Shi Weijian in supporting performances. The film based on the real life of Qiu Jin, focusing on her efforts in the 1900s to overthrow the corruption Qing Empire. The film was released in 1983 in China.

In 1984, the film won two Golden Rooster Awards including Best Supporting Actor and Best Props.

Plot

Cast
 Li Xiuming as Qiu Jin
 Li Zhiyu as Xu Xilin
 Chen Xiguang as Chen Tianhua
 Yu Shizhi as Gui Fu
 Wang Fuli as Wu Zhiying
 Huang Meiying as Xu Jichen
 Cong Shan as Xiu Rong
 Zhang Kezhong as Wang Jinfa
 Wu Wenlun as Hu Daonan
 Shi Weijian as Sun Yat-sen

Release
The film was released in 1983 in China.

Accolades

References

External links
 
 
 

1983 films
1980s Mandarin-language films
Chinese biographical films
Films directed by Xie Jin
Films set in 20th-century Qing dynasty
Films set in Beijing
Films set in Zhejiang
Films set in Tokyo
Films shot in Shanghai